Cassou is a department or commune of Ziro Province in southern Burkina Faso. The capital is Cassou. The population of the department was 40,833 in 2006.

Towns and villages
The department is composed of thirty villages, including the administrative seat, listed with preliminary 2006 population figures:

References

Departments of Burkina Faso
Ziro Province